Leucoptera is a small genus of flowering plants in chamomile tribe within the daisy family.

 Species
 Leucoptera asterocarpa Mart. - Brazil
 Leucoptera nodosa (Thunb.) B.Nord. - South Africa
 Leucoptera oppositifolia B.Nord. - South Africa
 Leucoptera subcarnosa B.Nord. - South Africa

References

Anthemideae
Asteraceae genera